The X Factor is a Greek and Cypriot television music competition to find new singing talent. The seventh series began airing on Mega Channel on March 18, 2022. Singer Christos Mastoras returned as judge for his second season, and three new judges joined, singer Mariza Rizou, singer and songwriter Stelios Rokkos‎ and singer and songwriter Michalis Kouinelis, who replaced Giorgos Theofanous, Melina Aslanidou and Michael Tsaousopoulos. The director and actor Andreas Georgiou takes over the presentation of the live shows, who replaced Despina Vandi. Singer Ilias Bogdanos and singer Katerina Lioliou were the backstage-hosts, who replaced Aris Makris. Ilias Psinakis was the guest judge only in the live shows. Nikos Mouratidis was the guest judge only in the live shows since the fourth week.

Judges and presenters
On February 1, 2022, Mega Channel announced that Christos Mastoras will return for his second season and with Mariza Rizou, Stelios Rokkos‎ and Michalis Kouinelis, as the judges. Also the two backstage-hosts were announced, Ilias Bogdanos and Katerina Lioliou. On February 15, 2022, it was announced that Andreas Georgiou will be the host of the live shows.

Four-chair challenge
40 acts faced the four-chair challenge, 10 from each team. The challenges were broadcast on 28 April, 29 April, 5 May and 12 May.

Key:
 – Contestant was immediately eliminated after performance without given a chair
 – Contestant was given a chair but swapped out later in the competition and eventually eliminated
 – Contestant was given a chair and made the final four of their own team

Contestants
The top 16 acts were confirmed as follows:

Key:
 – Winner
 – Runner-up

Live shows
The contestants were announced after each team performed at Four-chair challenge. There were 16 contestants (4 from each team). The Live Shows began airing on 22 May 2022.

Results summary
Colour key
 Act in team Mariza Rizou
 Act in team Christos Mastoras
 Act in team Michalis Kouinelis
 Act in team Stelios Rokkos

Live show details

Week 1 (22 May)
 Opening Performance: Mariza Rizou and her team: ("Petao") and Christos Mastoras and his team: ("Ola moiazoun kalokairi"/"Sweat (A La La La La Long)")

In the first live show, only the teams of Christos Mastoras and Mariza Rizou competed. This week's results show featured a double elimination, one from each team. This week's judge Ilias Psinakis had the power to give immunity to two contestants from each team. The act with the fewest public votes was then automatically eliminated.

Week 2 (29 May)
 Opening Performance: Stelios Rokkos and his team: ("Aggeloi") and Michalis Kouinelis and his team ("Still D.R.E."/"Everybody's Got to Learn Sometime"/"To Spourgiti")

In the second live show, only the teams of Stelios Rokkos and Michalis Kouinelis competed. This week's results show featured a double elimination, one from each team. This week's judge Ilias Psinakis had the power to give immunity to two contestants from each team. The act with the fewest public votes was then automatically eliminated.

Week 3 (5 June)
All the teams were to perform on the same night for first time this series. The three acts with the fewest votes were announced as the bottom three, and judge Ilias Psinakis had the power to give immunity one of the acts of the bottom three. The remaining two acts then performed in the final showdown for the judges' votes.

Judges' votes to eliminate
 Rizou: Borek
 Mastoras: Borek (×2)
 Kouinelis: Konstantinos Ntasios
 Rokkos: Konstantinos Ntasios

Week 4 (19 June)
The three acts with the fewest votes were announced as the bottom three, and judge Ilias Psinakis had the power to give immunity one of the acts of the bottom three. The remaining two acts then performed in the final showdown for the judges' votes.

Judges' votes to eliminate
 Rizou: Konstantinos Ntasios
 Mastoras: Giannis Onisiforou
 Kouinelis: Konstantinos Ntasios
 Rokkos: Konstantinos Ntasios

Week 5 (26 June)
The three acts with the fewest votes were announced as the bottom three, and judge Ilias Psinakis had the power to give immunity one of the acts of the bottom three. The remaining two acts then performed in the final showdown for the judges' votes.

Judges' votes to eliminate
 Rizou: Thanos Lambrou
 Mastoras: JCJO
 Kouinelis: Thanos Lambrou
 Rokkos: JCJO (×2)

Week 6 (3 July)
The three acts with the fewest votes were announced as the bottom three, and judge Ilias Psinakis had the power to give immunity one of the acts of the bottom three. The remaining two acts then performed in the final showdown for the judges' votes.

Due to personal reasons, the group Giname were unable to perform. They were given a bye to the following week.

Judges' votes to eliminate
 Rizou: Giannis Onisiforou
 Mastoras: Giannis Onisiforou
 Kouinelis: Miltos Charovas (×2)
 Rokkos: Miltos Charovas

Week 7: Semi-Final (8 July)

Week 8: Final (10 July)

References 

Greece 07
2022 Greek television seasons